Ayappakkam is a village in Thiruvallur district in the Indian state of Tamil Nadu. Ayapakkam is currently a village panchayat surrounded by Thiruverkadu municipality, Avadi corporation and Greater Chennai Corporations.

Location
Situated between Ambattur Industrial Estate, avadi and Thiruverkadu . Ayappakkam developed as a residential area, since 1990, after Tamil Nadu Housing Board quarters came up. Unlike Ambattur that houses more industrial units, Ayappakkam is predominantly a residential area and it connects with the city, via Anna Nagar, Mogappair, Nolambur, Athipet and Maduravoyal, through Poonamallee High Road, Chennai-Tiruvallur High (CTH) Road and Ambattur Industrial Estate Road.

Ayappakkam is close to the Chennai Bypass road.  Ezhil Nagar is one of the popular residential development in Ayapakkam approved by CMDA and has park.

Demographics

Population
In the 2011 census, Ayappakkam had a population of 28,630.

Transport

Railways 
Annanur railway station is connected with northern part of Ayapakkam. There are suburban trains crosses this station which travels to and from Chennai Central, Chennai Beach, Arakonam, Thiruvallur, Tiruthani and Velachery. Some trains originate from Avadi has an EMU Shed, which handles the majority of the suburban train operations on the Northern and Western line. The Western line has 229 services a day and the North line has 83, which accounts 312 trains.

Roadways

Chennai–Tiruttani highway 
From Chennai–Thiruvallur High Road it is about 1.5 km from Dunlop - Ambattur Police station junction. Also it is accessible from EVR Periyar Salai via Vanagaram - Ambattur, Athipet Road. We can also reach Ayapakkam from Avadi - Poonamalle High Road by taking Paruthipattu Road which joins at Koladi.

Chennai Bypass is the primary advantage for the location which helps Ayapakkam residents to reach other suburban parts of the city easily. It is located about 3 km from Ayapakkam and can be reached via Athipet Ambattur.

MTC Bus Terminus

We have several Bus services to and from Ayapakkam which connects the nearby prime locations. 77A, 147C Ext, 7M, S41, S54, 63, 73C are the services which connects Ayapakkam with Chennai Mofussil Bus Terminus (Koyambedu), T. Nagar, Broadway, Thiruverkadu and Ambattur Industrial Estate

Share Autos
Share Autos are one of the other modes of transport here. Share Autos are spotted near Dunlop - Ambattur Police station junction. Also on a timing basis share autos are operated from Ayapkkam to CMBT during peak hours. There are also private auto facilities

Water Resources 
With many sources of water around it, like Ayappakkam lake, Ayanambakkam lake, Thiruverkadu lake, Paruthipattu Lake and Ambattur Lake, Ayappakkam has good ground water.  Many water tankers fill water from Ayappakkam for supply to other locations.

Recreation 
Camp Tonakela Association
Camp Tonakela Association is located in South end of Thirumulaivoyal, North of Ayapakkam. Camp Tonakela is the brainchild of Wallace Forgie, a Canadian, who came to work with the Madras YMCA in the year 1927. As a dedicated boys’ work leader with a vast experience of outdoor camps, it was only natural that Forgie would attempt to address the deplorable lack of facilities for such activities in Madras. In the year 1938.

Also we have Paruthipattu Lake near by which has been restored as eco-park and opened to public on 21 June 2019. The eco-park surrounding the lake consists of a 3-km-long walking track, children's play area, refreshment block, a central plaza for public gathering, a boat deck with three landing areas, a couple of islands for nesting birds, an open-air theatre, an administration office building, and vehicle parking lot. About 35 varieties of plants have been planted around the lake.

In addition, we have Maharaja Royal Club at the adjacent area Ayanambakkam which is a paid recreation facility which has sports courts and swimming pools.

Work shop for Bike services and sports development also done in Carmel Work shop. They have team which Tuning ECU Programming and Mapping has done yet. From November 4 will Active in this Area.

Schools
 Sri Venkateswara matriculation higher secondary school
 Sri Venkateswara vidhyalaya (CBSE)
 Shri Krishnaswamy Matric School
 New Century Matriculation School
 Government High School Ayappakkam
 The Good Shepherd School 
 The Morning Star School 
 Jehovah Jireh Mat School
 Zamar Matriculation Higher Secondary School
 Velammal Vidyalaya
 Vijay Vidyalaya Matriculation Higher Secondary School
 St.Marry's matriculation school.
 Little holy angel's matriculation higher secondary school.
 Mahalakshmi vidya mandhir (CBSE)
 Mahalakshmi Matriculation school
 Sri Chaitanya Techno School
 Aachi Global School
 Birla Open Minds International School
 Orange Public School

References

Cities and towns in Tiruvallur district